Rush is the second studio album by Darude. It was released on July 15, 2003. It peaked at number four on The Official Finnish Charts.

Reception

MacKenzie Wilson of Allmusic praised the release in general, writing that Darude "builds upon the dynamics of Before the Storm, raises the pressure, and fuels the flame for an electrifying dozen-track set. Darude's talent in keeping the energy at an elevated level without losing touch with the album's overall ambience is what makes him a star and an integral part of the new-millennium dance scene. His classy mix of techno and trance is perfected into a fashionably slick spiral of synthesized heat." However, the review criticized the lack of variety between tracks, and gave it a generally low score of 2/5.

Track listing

Charts

Weekly charts

References

External links
 Darude.com
Rush at Allmusic

2003 albums
Darude albums